Arriba el telón o el patio de la morocha  (English language:Roughly, "Up the curtain of the Morocha Patio") is a 1951  Argentine musical drama film directed by Manuel Romero and written by Cátulo Castillo and Mariano Mores.The film premiered in early 1951 in Buenos Aires. The film starred Virginia Luque.

The film is a tango-based film, which is an integral part of Argentine culture.

Main cast
Hugo Del Carril first actor together Virginia Luque
Francisco Audenino
Sofía Bozán ....  Herself
Mario Faig
Severo Fernandez
Jovita Luna
Virginia Luque
Juan Carlos Mareco
Juan José Porta
Antonio Provitilo
Dora Vernet
León Zárate

External links
 

1951 films
1950s Spanish-language films
Tango films
Films directed by Manuel Romero
1950s musical drama films
1950s dance films
Argentine dance films
Argentine musical drama films
1951 drama films
Argentine black-and-white films
1950s Argentine films